Robenson Therezie (born August 5, 1991) is a former American football cornerback. He was signed by the Atlanta Falcons as an undrafted free agent after the 2015 NFL Draft. He played college football at Auburn.

Professional career

Atlanta Falcons
Following the 2015 NFL Draft, Therezie was signed by the Atlanta Falcons as an undrafted free agent. He made the team's 53-man roster on September 7, 2015. In Week 7 of the 2015 season, Therezie recorded his first career interception off Titans quarterback Zach Mettenberger in the final two minutes of the Falcons 10-7 victory.

On December 22, 2016, Therezie was released by the Falcons.

New Orleans Saints
Therezie was claimed off waivers by the New Orleans Saints on December 23, 2016. On August 12, 2017, Therezie was waived by the Saints.

New York Jets
On August 13, 2017, Therezie was signed by the New York Jets. He was waived on September 2, 2017.

Cincinnati Bengals
On December 13, 2017, Therezie was signed to the Cincinnati Bengals' practice squad. He signed a reserve/future contract with the Bengals on January 1, 2018. He was waived on May 14, 2018.

Indianapolis Colts
On August 18, 2018, Therezie was signed by the Indianapolis Colts. He was waived/injured on September 1, 2018 and was placed on injured reserve. He was released on September 28, 2018.

Tampa Bay Vipers
Therezie was drafted in the 9th round during phase four in the 2020 XFL Draft by the Tampa Bay Vipers. He was waived during final roster cuts on January 22, 2020.

Therezie was signed to the XFL's practice squad team, referred to as Team 9, on January 30, 2020.

Therezie re-signed with the Vipers on February 25, 2020. He had his contract terminated when the league suspended operations on April 10, 2020.

Therezie signed with the Conquerors of The Spring League in May 2021.

References

External links
Auburn Tigers bio

1991 births
Living people
Players of American football from Miami
Miami Jackson Senior High School alumni
American football safeties
Auburn Tigers football players
Atlanta Falcons players
New Orleans Saints players
New York Jets players
Cincinnati Bengals players
Indianapolis Colts players
Tampa Bay Vipers players
Team 9 players
The Spring League players